The Congupna Football & Netball Club, nicknamed the Road, is an Australian rules football and netball club based in the town of Congupna located just north of Shepparton, Victoria that currently compete in the Murray FNL.

History 
Congupna Football Club formed in 1956 and won the premiership of the Kyabram & District Football League in its first season. Congupna then transferred across to the Benalla Tungamah Football League in 1962.

The club then joined the Murray Football League in 1997.

A "Congupna" football club (with no ties with the current club) played in the Goulburn Valley Football Association from 1891 to 1906, being runners up fives times, only to go into recess for fifty years.

Football Premierships
Seniors

Reserves

Football League Best & Fairest Winners
Seniors
Kyabram & District Football League: 1956 to 1961
1957 – W Roe

Benalla Tungamah Football League: 1962 to 1996
1963 – Harry Brittain
1980 – Damian Drum
1983 – Chris Drum
1995 – C Joyce

Murray Football League: 1997 to present day
1998 – Shaun Gordon

References

External links
 
 Gameday website

Murray Football League clubs
Australian rules football clubs in Victoria (Australia)
1956 establishments in Australia
Sports clubs established in 1956
Australian rules football clubs established in 1956
Netball teams in Victoria (Australia)